James Hensel "Hank" Hulvey (July 18, 1897 – April 9, 1982) was a professional baseball player.  He was a right-handed pitcher for one season (1923) with the Philadelphia Athletics.  For his career, he compiled an 0–1 record, with a 7.71 earned run average, and two strikeouts in seven innings pitched.  He gave up Babe Ruth's 230th homerun on September 5, 1923, in his only game starting as pitcher.

Hulvey pitched 19 season in minor league baseball, winning 221 minor league games.  An alumnus of Shenandoah University, he was born and later died in Mount Sidney, Virginia at the age of 84.

External links

 https://www.baseball-reference.com/players/event_hr.cgi?id=ruthba01&t=b
 https://news.google.com/newspapers?nid=1928&dat=19230906&id=ArQgAAAAIBAJ&sjid=WGkFAAAAIBAJ&pg=1392,4188150&hl=en

1897 births
1982 deaths
Philadelphia Athletics players
Major League Baseball pitchers
Baseball players from Virginia
Minor league baseball managers
Martinsburg Blue Sox players
Martinsburg Mountaineers players
Portsmouth Truckers players
Fort Worth Panthers players
Salt Lake City Bees players
Hollywood Stars players
Chattanooga Lookouts players
Knoxville Smokies players
Birmingham Barons players
Little Rock Travelers players
Tacoma Tigers players
Bartlesville Chiefs players
Shenandoah Hornets baseball players
People from Augusta County, Virginia